David Oluoch Obuya (born 14 August 1979) is a former Kenyan cricketer. He is a right-handed batsman and a wicket-keeper. Obuya first played cricket at the Under-19s World Cup of 1998, where he starred as the opening batsman.

International career
His one-day career was to follow three years later. He first represented the senior team on a tour of the West Indies in 2001, where once again he was an opener, alongside Ravindu Shah. He played in the 2003 World Cup, where in the semi-final he set a record for the best eighth-wicket partnership in a match against India, beating the previous mark set by himself and team-mate Tony Suji.

Most recently, Obuya has played one-day cricket for Kenya against Bangladesh. His brothers, Kennedy Otieno and Collins Obuya, both play cricket in Kenya.

David Obuya was the first player in history of T20I as well as in ICC World Twenty20 history to be dismissed for being hit wicket and he was dismissed for a duck in that innings.

In October 2018, he was named as the head coach of the Kenya national cricket team, ahead of the 2018 ICC World Cricket League Division Three tournament in Oman.

References

External links
 

1979 births
Living people
Kenyan cricketers
Kenya One Day International cricketers
Kenya Twenty20 International cricketers
Northern Nomads cricketers
Cricketers at the 2003 Cricket World Cup
Cricketers at the 2007 Cricket World Cup
Cricketers at the 2011 Cricket World Cup
Wicket-keepers